The Peterborough City/Borough Police force was responsible for law enforcement in Peterborough, England, from 16 June 1874 to 1 April 1947, at which point it was merged with the Liberty of Peterborough Constabulary to form the Peterborough Combined Police.

Chief Constables of The Peterborough City Police Force

1874 - 1889 William Hurst
1889 - 1909 John William Lawson
1909 - 1915 John Edward Ker Watson
1915 - 1943 Thomas Danby, also Chief Constable of The Liberty of Peterborough Constabulary.
1943 - 1947 Francis George Markin, also Chief Constable of The Liberty of Peterborough Constabulary.

Sworn in Constables of the Peterborough Parish
On the Saturday 4 August 1860 at the Peterborough Petty Sessions and before the Rev William Strong (Chairman) and R.Mein, Esq. Nineteen local constables: W.Barber, T.Carnall, H.Gale, J.L.Lovell, W.Green, F.Mason, T.Squires, W.Templeman, S.Brakes, W.Chapman, J.Hobbs, D.Mitchell, R.Mason, C.Partlet, C.Smith, T.Wright, T.Woods, G.Edwards, and R.Arbeur.

See also
 Liberty of Peterborough Constabulary
 Peterborough Combined Police
 Cambridgeshire Constabulary
 Policing in the United Kingdom

References

Booklet Commemorating 100 years of service of THE PETERBOROUGH POLICE 1857 - 1957. And The OFFICIAL OPENING OF THE NEW POLICE HEADQUARTERS Bridge Street Peterborough. Printed by the 'Peterborough Standard' 10/10a Church Street Peterborough.
Commemorating Booklet PDF

Defunct police forces of England
Local government in Cambridgeshire
1836 establishments in England
Government agencies established in 1836
Organisations based in Peterborough